The team event competitions of the 2011 IPC Alpine Skiing World Championships were held at Kandahar Banchetta Giovanni N., in Sestriere, Italy on January 23. The skiers competed in giant slalom.

Overall Results

Key:   DNF = Did Not Finish

Individual Results

Women, visually impaired 
The athletes with a visual impairment has a sighted guide. The two skiers are considered a team, and dual medals are awarded.

Women, standing

Women, sitting

Men, visually impaired 
The athletes with a visual impairment has a sighted guide. The two skiers are considered a team, and dual medals are awarded.

Key:   DSQ = Disqualified

Men, standing 

Key:   DNF = Did Not Finish

Men, sitting 

Key:   DNS = Did Not Start, DNF = Did Not Finish

References

Team